SAVR or Savr may refer to:

 surgical aortic valve replacement (SAVR)
 Alto Río Senguer Airport (ICAO airport code: SAVR), Alto Río Senguer, Chubut, Argentina
 Savr Shalburov, a Russian wrestler who competed against Kurban Shiraev

See also

 Flavr Savr, a genetically modified tomato